Miss Universe UAE is a national beauty pageant that selects the representative of the United Arab Emirates for the Miss Universe competition. It was formally launched in October 2021 and was initially planned to held its 1st edition in November 2021 but later cancelled due to time constraint.

History
Miss Universe UAE was officially announced on 7 October 2021, during a press conference in Dubai. The inaugural competition was supposed to be held in 2021, with its winner making the nation's debut at the Miss Universe 2021 competition, but the pageant was cancelled due to time constraints and still no announcement yet from the organization. Miss Universe UAE does not have a swimsuit competition, instead incorporating a fashion couture round instead. Applications are open to all residents of the United Arab Emirates, rather than solely citizens.

Titleholders

Notes

References

External links

 
Beauty pageants in the United Arab Emirates
Women in the United Arab Emirates
Emirati awards
2021 establishments in the United Arab Emirates
Miss Universe by country